Norfolk and Suffolk-class lifeboats were lifeboats operated by the Royal National Lifeboat Institution (RNLI) from stations around the coasts of the United Kingdom and Ireland. They were able to operate further from shore and around the sandbanks common off East Anglia.

Description
Norfolk and Suffolk class of non-self righting lifeboats were designed to operate further from shore and specifically around East Anglia. Originally a pulling and sailing design, in 1906 the Walton-on-the-Naze's , built in 1900, was fitted with a 32 bhp petrol engine and served at the station until 1928. Originally, the engines in motor lifeboats were regarded as an auxiliary and they retained their full sailing rig. The conversion of James Stevens No. 14 was deemed a success and a further number of new motor lifeboats were built for service at East Anglian stations.

Pulling & Sailing lifeboats

Motor lifeboats

References

External links
 RNLI